Södertälje Fotbollsklubb is a Swedish football team from Södertälje, Stockholm County in Division 1 Norra. They play their matches at Södertälje Fotbollsarena.

Södertälje FK was founded in 2012 from the clubs Brunnsängs IK, Östertälje IK and FF Södertälje. Later, also Betnahrin IK and Syrianska BoIS, joined with Södertälje FK, and Södertälje took Betnahrin's place in Division 2.

References

Football clubs in Stockholm County
2012 establishments in Sweden
Association football clubs established in 2012
Sport in Södertälje